Halfway tram stop may refer to:

Halfway tram stop (Great Orme) on the Great Orme Tramway in Llandudno
Halfway tram stop (Sheffield), the terminus of the Sheffield Supertram Blue Line